Renat Mirzaliyev (born 24 March 1982) is an ethnic Azerbaijani judoka from Ukraine.

Achievements

External links
 

1982 births
Living people
Ukrainian male judoka
Ukrainian people of Azerbaijani descent